Weltersburg is an Ortsgemeinde – a community belonging to a Verbandsgemeinde – in the Westerwaldkreis in Rhineland-Palatinate, Germany.

Geography

Location
Weltersburg lies 4 km southeast of Westerburg. Since 1972 it has belonged to what was then the newly founded Verbandsgemeinde of Westerburg, a kind of collective municipality found only in Rhineland-Pfalz. Its seat is in the like-named town.

Natural monuments 
Between Weltersburg and Willmenrod is the rock formation and natural monument of Kranstein on the edge of a basalt quarry.

Politics

The municipal council is made up of 7 council members, including the extraofficial mayor (Bürgermeister), who were elected in a majority vote in a municipal election on 13 June 2004.

Economy and infrastructure

South of the community runs Bundesstraße 8, leading from Limburg an der Lahn to Hennef. The nearest Autobahn interchange is Montabaur on the A 3 (Cologne–Frankfurt). The nearest InterCityExpress stop is the railway station at Montabaur on the Cologne-Frankfurt high-speed rail line.

References

External links
 Weltersburg in the collective municipality’s Web pages 

Municipalities in Rhineland-Palatinate
Westerwaldkreis